Tasbapauni is a seacoast hamlet in Nicaragua,  north of Bluefields. The main ethnic groups are Creole and Miskito.

Ida, a hurricane from the 2009 Atlantic Hurricane Season, made landfall here.

Tasbapauni is a rich community in natural resources: lumber, lobster, turtle etc.

See also
Whisky Galore (novel)

References

Sources

Populated places in Nicaragua
South Caribbean Coast Autonomous Region
Road-inaccessible communities of North America